The 1999 Webby Awards were held on March 18, 1999, at the Herbst Theater (War memorial Opera House) in San Francisco, California.  IDG, which still owned the awards organization, continued to retain Tiffany Shlain to produce the awards even though the magazine division she had been working for had been shut down.  Mayor Rudy Giuliani had lobbied to move the ceremony to New York City, but San Francisco Mayor Willie Brown interceded with Schlain by promising the City's support, including hosting a post-award party at the newly remodeled City Hall.

Google founders Larry Page and Sergey Brin arrived wearing rollerblades and metallic capes, and remained in the opera hall lobby to grant interviews while most guests were watching the awards in the theater.  
The event was noted for the famous incident in which a representative of Jodi.org, which had won in the arts category, called the event participants "Ugly corporate sons-of-bitches" in his acceptance speech and tossed his trophy to the audience. The organizers asked PricewaterhouseCoopers to tabulate and ensure security for the "People's Voice" winners, chosen by online voting.

Nominees and winners

(from http://www.webbyawards.com/webbys/winners-1999.php?y=1999)

References
Winners and nominees are generally named according to the organization or website winning the award, although the recipient is, technically, the web design firm or internal department that created the winning site and in the case of corporate websites, the designer's client.  Web links are provided for informational purposes, both in the most recently available archive.org version before the awards ceremony and, where available, the current website.  Many older websites no longer exist, are redirected, or have been substantially redesigned.

External links
Official website

1999
1999 awards in the United States
1999 in San Francisco
March 1999 events in the United States